Livin' on the Edge is the fourteenth studio album by American country music artist T. G. Sheppard. It was released in 1985 via Columbia Records. The album includes the singles "Fooled Around and Fell in Love", "Doncha?" and "In Over My Heart"

Track listing

Chart performance

References

1985 albums
T. G. Sheppard albums
Columbia Records albums